U.S. Route 176 (US 176) is a spur of US 76 in the U.S. states of North Carolina and South Carolina. The U.S. Highway runs  from US 25 Business and North Carolina Highway 225 (NC 225) in Hendersonville, North Carolina, east to US 52 in Goose Creek, South Carolina. US 176 serves the transition region between the Blue Ridge Mountains and Foothills of Western North Carolina and the Upstate, Midlands, and Lowcountry regions of South Carolina. The highway passes through and connects Spartanburg, one of two major cities in the Upstate, and Columbia, the South Carolina state capital and central city of the Midlands. US 176 parallels and serves as a secondary highway to Interstate 26 (I-26) except for between Spartanburg and Columbia, where the U.S. Highway deviates from the I-26 corridor to serve Union.

Route description
US 176 spans  in North Carolina and runs  in South Carolina. The U.S. Highway is a part of the National Highway System in four locations in South Carolina. US 176 is part of the national system from I-85 Business near Spartanburg to South Carolina Highway 295 (SC 295) near Pacolet, during which the U.S. Highway is concurrent with either I-585 or SC 9. The highway's second stretch of National Highway System is along its concurrency with SC 72 around Whitmire. US 176 is also part of the system along its concurrencies with US 21, US 76, and US 321 on Elmwood Street and Huger Street north of SC 12 in Columbia. The highway's final section in which it is included in the National Highway System is during its concurrency with US 21 and US 321 from I-26 in Cayce to where US 321 splits from US 176 and US 21 south of Cayce.

Hendersonville to Spartanburg

US 176 begins at the southern end of Main Street in the city of Hendersonville. Main Street heads north into the downtown area as US 25 Business; the road also continues south as NC 225 (Greenville Highway). US 176 and US 25 Bus. head east concurrently along Spartanburg Highway, a four-lane highway with a center turn lane that heads through a commercial area and crosses over Norfolk Southern Railway's W Line. The highway leaves Hendersonville and heads southeast through the town of East Flat Rock. US 25 Bus. reaches its southern terminus at US 176's diamond interchange with US 25. US 176 reduces to two lanes and continues along a curvaceous path through the Blue Ridge Mountains, crossing the Green River. The road crosses the Henderson–Polk county line into the city of Saluda. US 176 and the railroad separate temporarily east of Saluda as they descend through the narrow valley of the North Pacolet River, with the railroad descending the inactive Saluda Grade, once the steepest standard gauge Class I railroad grade in the country.

At the opening of the North Pacolet River valley, US 176 follows Trade Street through the town of Tryon, where the highway meets the western end of NC 108 (Lynn Road). Southeast of Tryon, the U.S. Highway enters South Carolina, where it clips the northeastern corner of Greenville County. US 176 continues into Spartanburg County as Asheville Highway. In the town of Landrum, US 176 follows Howard Avenue and intersects SC 14 (Rutherford Street). The highway continues southeast across the South Pacolet River and through Campobello, the site of the highway's junctions with SC 11 (Pine Street) and SC 357 (Holly Springs Road). US 176 passes through the hamlet of Gramling before passing through the town of Inman, where the highway expands to four lanes with intermittent center turn lane and intersects SC 292, which heads north as Main Street and south as Lyman Road.

US 176 expands to a four-lane divided highway just west of its partial cloverleaf interchange with I-26. On the northern edge of the unincorporated community of Southern Shops, the highway has a partial directional interchange with SC 56, which continues straight as Asheville Highway into Spartanburg while US 176 follows Pine Street. There is no access from northbound SC 56 to eastbound US 176. Just east of the SC 56 interchange, US 176 has a diamond interchange with I-85. At Upper Valley Falls Road, the U.S. Highway becomes a freeway between Southern Shops to the south and Valley Falls to the north. US 176 has a diamond interchange with Valley Falls Road and a partial cloverleaf interchange with East Campus Boulevard; both roads provide access to the University of South Carolina Upstate. Just east of East Campus Boulevard is US 176's partial cloverleaf interchange with I-85 Business; there is no access to East Campus Boulevard from the ramp from southbound I-85 Business to westbound US 176.

US 176 continues east concurrent with I-585, with two-way frontage roads on both sides of the freeway. Just east of I-85 Business, there are ramps from eastbound US 176 and to westbound US 176 with the frontage roads. The frontage roads connect with California Avenue, which is accessed from the other direction by a half-diamond interchange after that street's overpass. East of the California Avenue interchange, US 176 has a pair of diamond interchanges with SC 9 and US 221 as the U.S. Highway enters the city of Spartanburg. SC 9 heads north from the three-ramp partial diamond interchange as Boiling Springs Road; the roadway continues south as Church Street as SC 9 joins US 176 in a concurrency. The movement from SC 9 to westbound US 176 is made via California Avenue. The interchange with US 221 (Whitney Road) is a diamond interchange; there, I-585 reaches its southern terminus and US 176 continues as a six-lane divided highway through a commercial area. US 176 and SC 9 pass the campus of Wofford College, including Gibbs Stadium and Benjamin Johnson Arena, and the headquarters of the Southern Conference, of which Wofford is a part, and crosses Norfolk Southern Railway's Charlotte District. Southeast of the railroad, US 176 and SC 9 meet the eastern end of SC 296 (Daniel Morgan Avenue), pass along the west side of Converse College, and intersect US 29 (St. John Street) on the east side of downtown Spartanburg.

Spartanburg to Columbia
US 176 and SC 9 head east out of Spartanburg as a four-lane highway with center turn lane. Just west of the town of Pacolet, the road passes under the W Line, expands to a divided highway, and meets the eastern end of SC 295 (Southport Road). East of SC 295, SC 9 splits east as Pine Street to pass through Pacolet while US 176 bypasses the town to the south. The U.S. Highway intersects SC 150 (Glenn Springs Road) before entering Union County, where the highway's name becomes Furman L. Fendley Highway. US 176 bypasses Jonesville while SC 9 passes directly through; east of the town, SC 9 veers east while SC 18 begins to parallel US 176 southeast to Union. US 176 intersects SC 215 (Buffalo West Springs Highway) and runs concurrently with the state highway on a four-lane road with center turn lane along the west side of town. The highways run concurrently with SC 49 between Rice Avenue, which SC 49 uses to bypass downtown Union, and Main Street. As US 176 and SC 215 curve east, they intersect SC 496 (Industrial Park Road/Union Boulevard), which is signed as SC 49 Truck. The bypass ends on the southern edge of town at the southern terminus of SC 18 (Pinckney Street). SC 215 heads east on Beltline Road while US 176 turns south onto Whitmire Highway.

US 176 continues south as a two-lane road, enters Sumter National Forest, and crosses the Tyger River. At the southern end of Union County, the U.S. Highway meets SC 72 and SC 121 (Carlisle Whitmire Highway) at a directional intersection. The three highways run concurrently on a four-lane undivided highway and cross the Enoree River into Newberry County and the town of Whitmire. There, SC 72 continues to the center of town on Union Street while US 176 and SC 121 follow Watson Street along the edge of town and head south as a two-lane road that crosses Duncan Creek. At Indian Creek, the U.S. Highway and state highway diverge southeasterly and southerly, respectively, shortly before US 176 exits the national forest at its junction with SC 34. US 176 has an oblique junction with SC 219 west of Pomaria, SC 773 within the town, and SC 202 east of the town. The highway meets the western end of SC 213 (Parr Road) west of the town of Peak before entering Richland County.

US 176 gradually edges closer to I-26 before meeting the Interstate at a partial cloverleaf interchange on the edge of the suburban area surrounding Columbia. The highway meets US 76 (Dutch Fork Road) at an oblique intersection and the two U.S. Highways head east together into the town of Irmo. The highways expand to a four-lane road with center turn lane and diverge at their partial cloverleaf interchange with I-26 (James F. Byrnes Expressway), at which US 76 joins the Interstate to head into Columbia. US 176 drops to two lanes and continues southeast into the town of St. Andrews, where the highway has an oblique junction with SC 60 (Lake Murray Boulevard) just west of Harbison State Forest. The highway expands to a four-lane road with center turn lane, passes by the Broad River Correctional Institution, and passes through the downtown area of St. Andrews, then has a diamond interchange with I-20. US 176 enters the city of Columbia, passes the Dutch Square mall, and curves east to cross the Broad River, the Columbia Canal, and Norfolk Southern's W Line on the Broad River Bridge.

US 176 continues on the east side of the river as River Drive. At its junction with Clement Avenue and SC 16 (Sunset Drive), River Drive veers southeast and becomes two lanes. US 176 crosses over a CSX rail line before reaching an oblique intersection with Main Street, where the highway begins a lengthy concurrency with US 21 and US 321. The highways follow four-lane Main Street to the Elmwood Park Historic District, where the highways gain a fourth route, US 76, when they turn west onto six-lane divided Elmwood Avenue at the northern edge of downtown Columbia. One block to the west, the four U.S. Highways meet the western end of SC 48 (Assembly Street). A few blocks further to the west, Elmwood Avenue becomes a freeway carrying I-126 and US 76 west out of downtown Columbia; US 176, US 21, and US 321 exit the freeway at a full Y interchange onto six-lane divided Huger Street. South of another crossing of the W Line, the highways intersect the westbound and eastbound directions of SC 12 at Taylor Street and Hampton Street, respectively. South of their intersection with US 1 and US 378 (Gervais Street), US 176, US 21, and US 321 pass two blocks west of the Columbia Amtrak station before they reach Blossom Street, which carries US 21 Connector and US 76 Connector east through the University of South Carolina campus. The U.S. Highways follow four-lane divided Blossom Street west across the Congaree River out of the city of Columbia into Lexington County.

Columbia to Goose Creek
US 176, US 21, and US 321 follow Knox Abbott Drive, a four-lane street with center turn lane, west through the city of Cayce, where they intersect SC 2 (State Street) and SC 35 (12th Street). The highways briefly enter the city of West Columbia when they veer southwest onto Charleston Highway. The U.S. Highways pass under a rail line and have an oblique junction with SC 302 (Edmund Road) before re-entering Cayce. US 176, US 21, and US 321 become a divided highway as they pass historic Columbia Speedway, pass over another rail line, and meet the southern end of SC 2 (Frink Street) at a directional intersection that lacks a connection from the south-heading U.S. Highways to northbound SC 2. The U.S. Highways continue south as a four-lane road plus center turn lane that crosses a pair of creeks before expanding to a six-lane divided highway and meeting I-26 at a partial cloverleaf interchange. Just south of that interchange, US 176, US 21, and US 321 meet ramps from the southern terminus of I-77 (Veterans Memorial Freeway) opposite Fish Hatchery Road.

The three U.S. Highways reduce to four lanes and cross over CSX's Columbia Subdivision east of the town of Pine Ridge. US 321 continues south toward Gaston and Swansea while US 176 and US 21 head southeast along Charleston Highway, which drops to two lanes. The two U.S. Highways meet I-26 at a partial cloverleaf interchange and briefly parallel the Interstate as they enter Calhoun County, where the highway is known as Old State Road. The highways diverge at Sandy Run, where US 21 heads south on Columbia Road toward Orangeburg and US 176 continues on Old State Road. West of St. Matthews, the U.S. highway runs concurrently with SC 6 between Caw Caw Road and Bridge Street. US 176 intersects US 601 (St. Matthews Road) and crosses over Norfolk Southern's SC Line south of the county seat of Calhoun County. The highway intersects SC 33 (Cameron Road) in the town of Cameron before leaving Calhoun County.

Shortly after entering Orangeburg County, US 176 intersects US 301 (Five Chop Road) just west of the latter highway's junction with SC 47. The highway intersects SC 210 (Vance Road) at the crossroads of Providence northwest of the U.S. Highway's diamond interchange with I-95. At Wells, US 176 has a five-way intersection with US 15 (Bass Drive) and SC 45 (Branchdale Highway). The highway meets the eastern end of SC 314 (Bunch Ford Road) west of the town of Holly Hill and SC 310 (Camden Road) just inside the town limits. In the center of town, US 176 has a pair of intersections with SC 453, Eutaw Road and Gardner Boulevard, on either side of a grade crossing of CSX's Charleston Subdivision.

US 176 enters Berkeley County by crossing the Dean Swamp, a tributary of the Four Hole Swamp. The U.S. Highway, which is named State Road, intersects SC 27 (Old Gilliard Road) and SC 311 shortly after entering the highway. US 176 heads southeast through a mixture of swamp and forest with occasional farmland before entering the suburban area around Charleston at its junction with US 17 Alternate (Live Oak Drive) on the edge of the city of Goose Creek. The highway continues as St. James Avenue, a four-lane road with center turn lane. US 176 expands to six lanes shortly before reaching its eastern terminus at an oblique intersection with US 52 (Goose Creek Boulevard). There is no direct access from eastbound US 176 to northbound US 52; that movement is made via Thomason Boulevard a few blocks to the northwest.

Major intersections

Special routes

Spartanburg alternate route

U.S. Route 176 Alternate (US 176 Alt.) was an alternate route in Spartanburg. It was established around 1938 after mainline US 176 was rerouted onto Asheville Highway and Church Street; the alternate route continued along the old route via Magnolia, Howard, and Main Streets. In 1948, it was downgraded to secondary road S-42-2. Some map inserts of the time list it as "US 176 Optional" (US 176 Opt.).

Spartanburg connector route 1

U.S. Route 176 Connector (US 176 Conn.) is a  connector route that connects US 221 (North Church Street) in the northern part of Spartanburg with I-585/US 176/SC 9 (North Pine Street) just north of the city. It is known as North Church Street and is an unsigned highway.

Spartanburg connector route 2

U.S. Route 176 Connector (US 176 Conn.) is a  connector route that connects US 221 (North Church Street) with I-585/US 176/SC 9 (North Pine Street) in the northern part of Spartanburg. It travels just north of Spartanburg Medical Center. It is known as East Wood Street and is an unsigned highway.

Union business loop

U.S. Route 176 Business (US 176 Bus) was a business loop through downtown Union, via Thompson Boulevard and Pinckney Street.  It was established around 1956, when the Duncan Bypass was completed and mainline US 176 was realigned along it.  Around 1990, US 176 Bus was decommissioned and replaced by an extension of SC 18.

Union connector 

U.S. Route 176 Connector (US 176 Conn.) is a  connector route in Union. It connects US 176 (North Duncan Avenue) and South Carolina Highway 18 (SC 18; Thompson Road), along Connector Road. Its entire length is part of SC 18 Truck.

It officially appears on county and state maps, while highway signage identifies it as "TO" US 176. It was created when US 176 was rerouted onto new alignment north of Union, with the elimination of US 176 Business and extension of SC 18; Connector Road was originally part of Duncan Bypass, built around 1956.

Whitmire connector route

U.S. Route 176 Connector (US 176 Conn.) is a  connector route in the eastern part of Whitmire. It connects South Carolina Highway 72 (SC 72; Church Street / Union Street) and US 176 (Watson Street). It shares the Church Street name with SC 72 and is an unsigned highway.

See also

References

External links

NCRoads.com Annex: US 176
The Highways of South Carolina: US 176
 Endpoints of U.S. Highway 176

76-1
76-1
76-1
Transportation in Henderson County, North Carolina
Transportation in Polk County, North Carolina
Transportation in Greenville County, South Carolina
Transportation in Spartanburg County, South Carolina
Transportation in Union County, South Carolina
Transportation in Newberry County, South Carolina
Transportation in Richland County, South Carolina
Transportation in Lexington County, South Carolina
Transportation in Calhoun County, South Carolina
Transportation in Orangeburg County, South Carolina
Transportation in Berkeley County, South Carolina
1